Dictyoglomus is a genus of bacterium, given its own Phylum, called the Dictyoglomi.
This organism is extremely thermophilic, meaning it thrives at extremely high temperatures. It is chemoorganotrophic, meaning it derives energy by metabolizing organic molecules. This organism is of interest because it elaborates an enzyme, xylanase, which digests xylan, a heteropolymer of the pentose sugar xylose. By pretreating wood pulp with this enzyme, paper manufacturers can achieve comparable levels of whiteness with much less chlorine bleach.

It has been described as Gram-negative, with a triple-layered wall.

References

Further reading

External links
Type strain of Dictyoglomus thermophilum at BacDive -  the Bacterial Diversity Metadatabase

Gram-negative bacteria